Boursinia is a genus of moths of the family Noctuidae. The genus was described by Wilhelm Brandt in 1938, and the genus name honours Charles Boursin, who worked extensively on the family Noctuidae.

Species
Boursinia candida (Boursin, 1964) Pakistan
Boursinia deceptrix (Staudinger, 1900) Syria, Jordan, Arabia, Egypt
Boursinia ferdovsi (Brandt, 1941) Iran, United Arab Emirates
Boursinia malitiosa (Alphéraky, 1892) Kazakhstan
Boursinia merideremica Hacker, 2004 Namibia
Boursinia oxygramma Brandt, 1938 Iran
Boursinia symmicta Brandt, 1938 Iran

References

Hadeninae